This is a list of Executive Council of Hong Kong non-official members convenors.

List
List of Convenor of the Non-Official Members of the Executive Council of Hong Kong:

Notes

See also 
Senior Unofficial Member

References

Hong Kong
Convenors